The Serein is a river in eastern France.

Serein may also refer to:

Serein (meteorology), rain falling from a cloudless sky
"Serein" (song), by Katatonia, 2016
Syrah or sereine, a variety of grape